In mathematics, a quartan prime is a prime number of the form x4 + y4 where x and y are positive integers. The odd quartan primes are of the form 16n + 1.

For example, 17 is the smallest odd quartan prime: 14 + 24 = 1 + 16 = 17.

With the exception of 2 (x = y = 1), one of x and y will be odd, and the other will be even. If both are odd or even, the resulting integer will be even, and 2 is the only even prime. 

The first few quartan primes are
2, 17, 97, 257, 337, 641, 881, … .

See also
Fourth power
Quartic

References
 Neil Sloane, A Handbook of Integer Sequences, Academic Press, NY, 1973.

Classes of prime numbers